Martin Glossop (born 18 July 1989 in Bristol) is a Grand Prix motorcycle racer from the United Kingdom.

Career statistics

By season

Races by year
(key) (Races in bold indicate pole position)

References

External links
 Profile on motogp.com

British motorcycle racers
English motorcycle racers
Living people
1989 births